Wesleyan Seminary may refer to:
Albion College (formerly Wesleyan Seminary) in Albion, Michigan 
Genesee Wesleyan Seminary in Lima, New York
Gouverneur Wesleyan Seminary in St. Lawrence County, New York
Wesley Seminary in Marion, Indiana
Wilbraham Wesleyan Academy in Wilbraham, Massachusetts